Jean François-Hyacinthe Langlais III (15 February 1907 – 8 May 1991) was a French composer of modern classical music, organist, and improviser. He described himself as "" ("Breton, of Catholic faith").

Biography 
Langlais was born in La Fontenelle (Ille-et-Vilaine, Brittany), a small village near Mont Saint-Michel, France to Jean-Marie-Joseph Langlais II, a blacksmith and Flavie Canto, a seamstress. Langlais became blind due to glaucoma when he was only two years old and was sent to the Institut National des Jeunes Aveugles (National Institute for Blind Children) in Paris, where he began to study the organ, with André Marchal. From there he progressed to the Paris Conservatoire, obtaining prizes in organ and studying composition with Marcel Dupré and Paul Dukas. He also studied improvisation with Charles Tournemire.

After graduating, Langlais returned to the National Institute for Blind Children to teach, and also taught at the Schola Cantorum in Paris from 1961 to 1976. Many of his students went on to become important musicians, including organists and composers; among them was the American Kathleen Thomerson, who later published a bio-bibliography about him. Another one was Margreeth Chr. de Jong, a dutch organist , composer and music educator.

His first wife Jeanette asked his former student, personal recital liaison and friend Ann Labounsky in 1972 to write Langlais' biography Jean Langlais the Man and His Music, though it was not published until 2000; nine years after Langlais' death. Labounsky did her doctoral paper in 1991 on the life and works of Langlais and fortunately she was able to share some of it with Langlais before he died. However Langlais was displeased as Labounsky was truthful in what she saw as Langlais wanted to be painted as the way he saw his truth. Labounsky admitted that at times Langlais could be a complex person but Langlais did not see himself this way. This was partly due to the region of Brittany in which he grew up as the Bretons considered themselves to be a proud people who loved to tell folklore.

It was as an organist that Langlais made his name, following in the footsteps of César Franck and Charles Tournemire as organiste titulaire at the Basilica of Sainte-Clotilde in Paris in 1945, a post in which he remained until 1988. He was much in demand as a concert organist, and widely toured across Europe and the United States. His 3rd North American tour lasted from January through March 1956, and saw him play on both coasts.

Langlais died in the 15th arrondissement of Paris at the age of 84, and was survived by his second wife Marie-Louise Jaquet-Langlais and three children, Janine, Claude and Caroline. The position of organist at Sainte-Clotilde was succeeded to by Jacques Taddei.

Music
Langlais was a prolific composer, composing 254 works with opus numbers, the first of which was his Prelude and Fugue for organ (1927), and the last his Trio (1990), another organ piece. Although best known as a composer of organ music and sacred choral music, he also composed a number of instrumental, orchestral and chamber works and some secular song settings.

Langlais' music is written in a highly individual eclectic  style, venturing well beyond what might be expected of mid-twentieth-century French music, with rich and complex harmonies and overlapping modes, sometimes more tonal than his contemporary, friend and countryman Olivier Messiaen, sometimes related to his two predecessors at Sainte-Clotilde, Franck and Tournemire, but sometimes also employing serial techniques and often exhibiting an earthy, Celtic folkiness which owes not a little to Bartok: "" as one early reviewer wrote.

His best-known works include his four-part masses, Messe solennelle and Missa Salve Regina, his Missa in simplicitate for unison voice and organ, and his many organ compositions, including:
Hymne d'actions de grâces from Three Gregorian Paraphrases
La nativité and Les rameaux (The Palms) (Poèmes Evangeliques)
Chant héroïque, Chant de paix, and De profundis from Nine Pieces
Kyrie "Orbis factor"  from Livre œcuménique
Incantation pour un jour saint (Incantation for Easter)
Cantilene (Suite brève)
Suite médiévale
Folkloric Suite
Trois méditations sur la Sainte Trinité
Fête, Op. 51
24 Pieces for harmonium or organ, Op. 6
Hommage a Frescobaldi

Discography

Albums
 Langlais joue Langlais, 1976
 Missa Salve Regina; Messe solennelle, (English Chamber Orchestra Brass Ensemble; The Choir of Westminster Cathedral/David Hill), 1988
 Jean Langlais Live, St. Augustin, Wien, 1993
 Organ works (Kevin Bowyer), 1994
 Messe solennelle - Missa in Simplicitate - Missa Misericordiae Domini - Ensemble Vocal Jean Sourisse, dir. Jean Sourisse, 1996
 Suite Médiévale / Cinq Méditations sur l'Apocalypse, 1996
  The complete organ works of César Franck on the organ of the Basilica of Sainte Clotilde, Paris (1963) [2 CD], 1996
 Chants de Bretagne [Andréa Ar Gouilh voix - Jacques Kauffmann, orgue, Orgue Cavaillé-Coll de Saint-Servan], 1997
 Musique de chambre avec piano, 2001
 Un centenaire (George Baker, organ), 2007

DVDs
 Life and Music of Jean Langlais, 2007, Los Angeles chapter of the American Guild of Organists.

Bibliography
 Langlais Marie-Louise (2016), Jean Langlais remembered, free online, ml-langlais.com and agohq.org
 Labounsky, A. (2000), Jean Langlais: The Man and His Music, Amadeus Press, 
 Jaquet-Langlais, M-L. (1995), Ombre et Lumière : Jean Langlais 1907-1991, Paris: Éditions Combre, 
 Thomerson, K. (1988), Jean Langlais: A Bio-Bibliography, Greenwood (Bio-Bibliographies in Music: Book 10),

Notes

References

External links
 Official website
 Official tribute website (includes full list of works)
 Website of the Association of the Friends of Jean Langlais
 Langlais mp3 files

1907 births
1991 deaths
20th-century classical composers
Blind classical musicians
Breton musicians
Cathedral organists
French classical organists
French male organists
French classical composers
French male classical composers
French Roman Catholics
Organ improvisers
People from Ille-et-Vilaine
Academic staff of the Schola Cantorum de Paris
20th-century organists
20th-century French composers
20th-century French male musicians
Male classical organists
French blind people